Okenia miramarae is a species of sea slug, specifically a dorid nudibranch, a marine gastropod mollusc in the family Goniodorididae.

Distribution
This species was described from Cuba, Caribbean Sea. It has been reported and illustrated with photographs from Gran Canaria, Canary Islands.

Description 
The maximum recorded body length is 5 mm.

Habitat 
Minimum recorded depth is 20 m. Maximum recorded depth is 20 m.

References

External links

Goniodorididae
Gastropods described in 2000